Courtney Shropshire (July 10, 1877 – 1965), a prominent medical doctor in Birmingham, Alabama, was the founder and first president of Civitan International.

Early life
Shropshire was born in New Orleans, Louisiana in 1877. While living in Jackson, Mississippi, he briefly attended Mississippi A&M, Millsaps College, and Ward's Business College. After moving to Franklin, Tennessee, to avoid an outbreak of yellow fever, he took a job as an assistant for a local doctor. This experience led him to enroll in the medical school of the University of Tennessee in Nashville.

After graduating in 1900, Shropshire began to practice in several small towns. He moved to Birmingham, Alabama in 1903. He completed post-graduate studies at the Johns Hopkins University School of Medicine and the Mayo Clinic. Shropshire also served as the United States Public Health Service representative for Birmingham and the president of the Jefferson County Medical Society.

Founding of Civitan International
Shropshire was attending a newly organized Rotary club in 1917. He and several of the other Rotarians decided that the club was too focused on increasing the business of its members. They surrendered their Rotary charter and formed an independent service club focused on serving the community and meeting the needs of individuals that could be served person to person, rather than business for business. By serving and creating a healthy-whole community, the businesses would naturally thrive. They held their first meeting on March 17, 1917, with 37 charter members.  They named the group the "Civitan Club." Shropshire was elected president for two successive terms as the club grew to 200 members. He envisioned an international organization of clubs, but the nation's focus on World War I prevented the club from becoming anything more than a local club.

With businessmen in other cities asking to form clubs, the International Association of Civitan Clubs was established in 1920; it would later become Civitan International. Shropshire was elected as the first international president for two years in a row; he remains the only individual to serve two terms as international president.

After his terms ended, Shropshire continued to actively promote Civitan. He was a frequent speaker at Civitan's international conventions, and he visited clubs across the country until his death in 1965.

Awards and honors

 Key to the city of Birmingham, Alabama (1957)
 Honorary citizen of New Orleans, Louisiana, and key to the city (1958)
 Key to the city of San Diego, California (1958)
 Key to the city of Memphis, Tennessee (1960)
 Honorary citizen of Dallas, Texas (1960)

Sources

1877 births
1965 deaths
Physicians from Birmingham, Alabama
American humanitarians
American philanthropists
Activists from Birmingham, Alabama